Traunstein station is the only station of the large district town of Traunstein in the German state of Bavaria. It has four main line platform tracks and two bay platform tracks and is classified by Deutsche Bahn as a category 4 station. The station is a rail junction and is located on the Rosenheim–Salzburg, Traunstein–Ruhpolding, Traunstein–Waging and Traunstein–Garching lines.

Location
The station is located in the centre of the town of Traunstein. Southeast of the station is the Bahnhofsplatz (station forecourt), which the station building faces. The station building has the address of Bahnhofsplatz 5. To the north Wasserburgerstraße passes under the railway tracks. Güterhallenstraße ("freight hall street") runs northeast of the railway precinct.

History

The station was opened on 7 May 1860 with the completion of the Rosenheim–Traunstein line. It was established as a centre for rail and postal traffic. On 1 August 1860, the line was completed to Salzburg. The station initially had four tracks, loading tracks with a loading shed and a loading dock and a turntable. The line had five turnout guard posts. Opposite the station there was the watering point to supply the engines with water. The station building was a two storey brick building, which had three apartments for the station master, the track master (Bahnmeister) and the operations inspector. On the side of the building on the ground floor there were numerous extensions. In front of the ticket office there were extensions to the left and the right, which housed a waiting room, the station master’s office and the post office. The main building housed another waiting room and luggage handling. In 1888, the tracks of the station were rebuilt as a result of the increasing volume of traffic on the Munich–Salzburg railway. On 7 September 1891, the station was rebuilt again for the opening of the Traun-Alz Railway (Traunstein–Garching railway). In addition, a roundhouse was installed in the station. In 1892, construction began on a new, southwestern extension of the station building, which was completed in 1894. In 1895, the branch line was completed to Ruhpolding, which had to be connected for topographical reasons to platform 1. As platform 1 was (and continues to be) also used for long-distance trains, platform 1a was established at the beginning of the branch line but connected to platform 1. In 1894, work started in Traunstein to duplicate the Munich–Rosenheim line. The upgrade of Traunstein station was completed in 1896. After the completion of this work, the station had four through platform tracks, a bay platform—where trains to and from Trostberg could reverse—and four sidings in the rear for parking. A new freight shed was built with an independent loading track. During the renovation of the station, a centralised interlocking panel for controlling the signalling was installed and two new signal boxes were built for guarding points. A pedestrian bridge was built in 1899. The branch line was opened to Waging on 1 December 1902. Therefore, another bay platform and extra storage tracks were built.  The office for managing rail operations in Traunstein was dissolved on 1 February 1911. On 20 April 1928, electrification of the railway station was completed; it involved replacing the pedestrian bridge with an underpass. From 1927 to 1928 new buildings were built for the railway and the office of the catenary supervisor (Fahrleitungsmeisterei). A new carriage shed for electric multiple units was also built.

The station buildings were completely destroyed on 18 and 25 April 1945 during aerial bombardment in the closing stages of the Second World War. Over 100 civilians, many of which had taken shelter in a nearby underpass, were killed.

Reconstruction and operation today

To replace the destroyed interlocking panel in the station building, the second signal box for guarding points was converted to house an interlocking panel. The station building was replaced by a wooden shed.  Planning for a new station began in 1952. The planned building was similar to the station building in Bad Reichenhall. The following facilities were planned: an operations room, a luggage hall, a ticket office, a lobby, lavatories, a station restaurant and upstairs apartments for railway employees. The side of the building next to the station forecourt was glazed and connected by stairs to the forecourt. The cost of the building was 740,000 Deutsche Mark, with DM 160,000  provided by Deutsche Bundesbahn and DM 580,000 provided by the state of Bavaria. The electrification of the Traunstei–Ruhpolding line was completed on 3 November 1955. The Ruhpolding locomotive depot was moved to Traunstein. A new track plan interlocking of class SpDrS60 was put into operation on 14 July 1964. The signal box was built to the west of the station building. On 26 September 1976, Traunstein, became a node for freight operations, but this was discontinued on 1 June 1983. The roundhouse was demolished in the 1980s. Since 1986, signalling at Übersee station has been remotely controlled by the dispatcher in Traunstein. Local freight operations in Traunstein were abandoned on 29 October 1997. The station building was renovated for 800,000 DM in 1997. Today, the building houses a bank branch and a travel centre. In 2016, the station was made barrier-free.

Platforms

The track and platform area was significantly rebuilt in 2016. Thus, all tracks were dismantled from track 1b and southeast of it. Also, the former engine shed and the building of the supervisor of track maintenance (Bahnmeisterei) were removed. The platform on track 2 no longer exists. All stopping passenger trains towards Salzburg now run on track 1. Track 2 is now used exclusively as a passing and overtaking track. In the course of these reconstruction measures, the platform height on track 1 was significantly increased. This had  already happened a few years ago in the area of  tracks 3, 4 and 5. Instead of tracks and buildings in the southeastern area of the station there is now a parking lot.

Platform lengths and heights are as follows:

 Track 1: length 315 m, height 76 cm
 Track 1a: length 143 m, height 55 cm
 Track 3: length 323 m, height 76 cm
 Track 4: length 115 m, height 55 cm
 Track 5: length 323 m, height 55 cm

Rail services 

The station is located between the larger stations of Rosenheim and Salzburg and is served by InterCity services. Austrian “corridor” trains (which run between Salzburg and Innsbruck through Germany without stopping) and Railjet services run through without stopping in Traunstein.

Long distance services

Traunstein station is served by InterCity and EuroCity trains between Munich and Austria. The EuroCity lines 62 and 32 together provide a service every two hours. On line 62, a pair of services run from Munich to Klagenfurt, two pairs of services run from Frankfurt to Klagenfurt, another pairs runs from Frankfurt to Graz, one pairs runs from Frankfurt to Linz and a pair runs from Saarbrücken to Graz. One pair of trains of line 32 runs from Münster or Dortmund to Klagenfurt under the name of Wörthersee. The station is also served by a pair of services each day on line 26 between Altona and Berchtesgaden, which runs under the name of Königssee, and by line 60 between Karlsruhe and Salzburg.

The Austrian Federal Railways (ÖBB) Railjet trains running between Munich and Budapest via Vienna pass through the station every two hours without stopping. ÖBB corridor trains running between Salzburg and Kufstein on the Rosenheim curve also pass through the station without stopping.

Future

A connection to the network of the Salzburg S-Bahn is planned, but there are still no concrete plans.

Notes

References

 

Railway stations in Bavaria
Railway stations in Germany opened in 1860
Traunstein (district)